Roim Olam (lit. Seeing the World) is a Weekly foreign News Magazine from Israel public Television Channel 1  News - Israel Broadcasting Authority (IBA), broadcast since 1987, every Shabat evening.

The show was initially presented by Emmanuel Halperin, and today by Ya'akov Ahimeir. The show opens with a news flash segment (usually presented by Dalia Mazor), and thereafter stories segments on various current affairs and culture matters from around the world are being broadcast. Many of the show's story segments are borrowed from foreign news magazines, many times from 60 Minutes, and from France 24 and more.

External links
Roim Olam website 

Channel 1 (Israel) original programming
Israeli television news shows
Kan 11 original programming